Het Brein Dat Kwam Uit De Ruimte ("The brain that came from space") is an experimental electronic Dutch band from Heemskerk.

Biography
Active since 2006, Het Brein won the IJmond Popprijs, a band competition, in 2007. In 2008, they also participated in the IJmond competition, and again in 2009, when they made the finals. As the 2007 winners of the Popmania competition, they were given the closing slot at the annual Popmania festival in Heerhugowaard.

In 2009, they played twice at Beeckestijn Pop, a festival in Velsen attended by 15,000. Their regular session was a "smashing" show, and they added an all-acoustic session which was filmed by VPRO's 3VOOR12.

Discography

De Invasie is Begonnen (2008)
Debut album, independently released.

De Zesde Dimensie (2009)

Album was recorded at Big River Studio in Dirkshorn, engineered by Mark Leendertse.

Track list
Urban
De Zesde Dimensie
Allenpiraat
Volg De Orders

Line-up
Jeroen Besseling – drums, vocals
Jasper "Spook" Everaerd – keyboards, vocoder, vocals
Steven van Egmond – guitar, bass, vocals

References

External links
Band website

Dutch electronic music groups
Heemskerk